Theresa M. Offredy (4 May 1930 – 17 April 2017) was a British fencer. Offredy competed in the women's team foil event at the 1964 Summer Olympics. She represented England in the individual foil at the 1962 British Empire and Commonwealth Games in Perth, Western Australia. Offredy died in April 2017 at the age of 86.

References

External links
 

1930 births
2017 deaths
British female foil fencers
Olympic fencers of Great Britain
Fencers at the 1964 Summer Olympics
Fencers at the 1962 British Empire and Commonwealth Games
Commonwealth Games competitors for England